Collin Charles Franklin (born July 20, 1988) is a former American football tight end. He was signed by the New York Jets as an undrafted free agent in 2011. He played college football at Iowa State. He currently play for the Portuguese team Lisboa Devils and produces music.

References

External links
 Tampa Bay Buccaneers bio

1988 births
Living people
People from Simi Valley, California
Players of American football from California
American football tight ends
Iowa State Cyclones football players
New York Jets players
Tampa Bay Buccaneers players
Sportspeople from Ventura County, California